Programs capable of Astrometric solving:

The solvers Elbrus and Charon are obsolete and no longer developed.

External links
 Astrometry.net webpage
 All sky solver webpage  
 ANSVR webpage
 Astrometry.net API lite 
  Astrotortilla webpage
 CloudMakers webpage
 Stellar Solver 
 ASTAP webpage
 Regim webpage
 Siril webpage
 SIPS webpage
 Tetra3 webpage
 XParallax viu webpage
 Astrometrica webpage
 Observatory webpage
 PinPoint webpage
 PixInsight webpage
 PlaneWave Instruments webpage
 TheSky Astronomy Software webpage
 Logiciel PRISM
 PlateSolve3 info

 
Astronomical imaging
Astronomy software
Lists of software